The Parks Covered Bridge, in Perry County, Ohio near Chalfants, Ohio, was built in 1883.  It was listed on the National Register of Historic Places in 1974.

It was built by William A. Dean and J.T. Tracey.

It spans a branch of Jonathan Creek and is a "very good example" of a multiple kingpost truss covered bridge.

It is located south of Chalfants, and north of Somerset on County Road 33, in Hopewell Township, Perry County, Ohio.

References

Covered bridges in Ohio
National Register of Historic Places in Perry County, Ohio
Bridges completed in 1883